The 2018 Alderney general election was held on 1 December 2018 to elect 5 members of the States of Alderney who will serve until 2022.

Results

2020 by-election
A by-election was held on 10 October 2020 to replace David Earl, who had resigned in August 2020. Two candidates stood for election, the winner will serve until December 2022.

References

Elections in Alderney
Alderney
2018 in Guernsey
December 2018 events in Europe